Southern Roses is a 1936 British musical comedy film directed by Frederic Zelnik and starring George Robey, Gina Malo and Chili Bouchier. It was shot at Denham Studios. The film's sets were designed by the art director Frederick Pusey.

Cast
 George Robey as Mr. Higgins 
 Neil Hamilton as Reggie 
 Gina Malo as Mary Rowland 
 Chili Bouchier as Estrella Estrello 
 Vera Pearce as Carrie 
 Richard Dolman as Bill Higgins 
 Athene Seyler as Mrs. Rowland 
 D. A. Clarke-Smith as Senor Estrello 
 Sara Allgood as Miss Florence 
 Leslie Perrins as Don Ramon 
 Hal Gordon as Mr. Mountford 
 Gus McNaughton as Parker

References

Bibliography
 Low, Rachael. Filmmaking in 1930s Britain. George Allen & Unwin, 1985.
 Wood, Linda. British Films, 1927-1939. British Film Institute, 1986.

External links

1936 films
British musical comedy films
1936 musical comedy films
Films directed by Frederic Zelnik
Films shot at Denham Film Studios
Films set in Barcelona
Films set in London
British black-and-white films
1930s English-language films
1930s British films